The following railroads operate in the U.S. state of Oklahoma.

Common freight carriers
Arkansas–Oklahoma Railroad (AOK)
Arkansas Southern Railroad (ARS)
AT&L Railroad (ATLT)
Blackwell Northern Gateway Railroad (BNGR)
BNSF Railway (BNSF)
Cimarron Valley Railroad (CVR)
Farmrail Corporation (FMRC)
Grainbelt Corporation (GNBC)
Kansas City Southern Railway (KCS)
Kiamichi Railroad (KRR)
Northwestern Oklahoma Railroad (NOKL)
Port of Muskogee Railroad (PMR)
Sand Springs Railway (SS)
South Kansas and Oklahoma Railroad (SKOL)
Stillwater Central Railroad (SLWC)
Texas, Oklahoma and Eastern Railroad (TOE)
Port of Catoosa Industrial Railroad (PCIR)
Tulsa–Sapulpa Union Railway (TSU)
Union Pacific Railroad (UP)
WFEC Railroad Company (WFEC)
Wichita, Tillman and Jackson Railway (WTJR)

Passenger carriers

Amtrak (AMTK)
Oklahoma City Streetcar
El Reno Heritage Express

Defunct railroads

Electric
Ardmore Traction Company
Bartlesville Interurban Railway
Chickasha Street Railway
Choctaw Railway and Lighting Company
Choctaw Electric Company
El Reno Interurban Railway
Enid City Railway
Guthrie Railway
Indian Territory Traction Company
Muskogee Electric Traction Company
Northeast Oklahoma Railroad (NEO)
Oklahoma Railway (OK)
Oklahoma City Railway
Oklahoma City and Suburban Railway
Oklahoma Traction Company
Oklahoma Union Railway
People's Electric Railway
Pittsburg County Railway
Sand Springs Railway
Sand Springs Interurban Railway
Southwest Missouri Railroad Company
Sapulpa & Interurban Railway
Sapulpa Union Railway
Shawnee–Tecumseh Traction Company
Shawnee Traction Company
Tulsa Street Railway

Notes

References
Association of American Railroads (2003), . Retrieved May 11, 2005.

Oklahoma
 
 
Railroads